Grace Talusan is a Filipino American writer. Her 2019 memoir, The Body Papers, won the Restless Books Prize for New Immigrant Writing and the Massachusetts Book Award in nonfiction, and was a New York Times Editors' Choice selection. Her short story "The Book of Life and Death" was the Boston Book Festival's One City One Story selection in 2020.

Talusan was born in the Philippines, and moved to Massachusetts when she was 2. She graduated from Tufts University and holds an MFA from UC Irvine. She is currently the Fannie Hurst Writer in Residence at Brandeis University.

Reception 
In a New York Times review, Jennifer Szalai wrote that The Body Papers "doesn’t track a one-way march to triumph from adversity; Talusan’s essays loop in on themselves, as she retrieves old memories and finds unexpected points of connection."

Kirkus Reviews said of The Body Papers, "Moving and eloquent, Talusan’s book is a testament not only to one woman’s fierce will to live, but also to the healing power of speaking the unspeakable. A candidly courageous memoir."

In a review in NYLON, https://www.nylon.com/body-papers-grace-talusan-review Ilana Masad calls the memoir "stunning" and writes, "Grace Talusan is honest and elegant about some of life's most difficult moments."

Works

Books 
 The Body Papers (2019)

Anthologies 
 Alone Together: Love, Grief, and Comfort in the Time of COVID-19 (2020)
 And We Came Outside and Saw the Stars Again (2020)

Short stories 
 "The Book of Life and Death"  (2020)

References 

Year of birth missing (living people)
Living people
American people of Filipino descent
American women writers
21st-century American writers
Tufts University alumni
University of California, Irvine alumni
21st-century American women